The assassination of Erkut Akbay refers to the murder of the Turkish administrative attache, Erkut Akbay, 40, in Lisbon, where the diplomat was serving, on 7 June 1982. Akbay was assassinated near his home on the outskirts of the city as he returned home for lunch. He was killed instantly while sitting in his car. His wife, Nadide Akbay, 39, was also shot in the head as she sat beside him. Nadide was rushed to a hospital in a coma and underwent surgery. She died after eight months in coma on 11 January 1983 in Ankara hospital.

A group calling itself Justice Commandos of the Armenian Genocide claimed responsibility.

See also 
 List of Turkish diplomats assassinated by Armenian militant organisations

References 

1980s in Lisbon
1982 murders in Portugal
Assassinated Turkish diplomats
Assassinations in Portugal
Crime in Lisbon
June 1982 events in Europe
Justice Commandos of the Armenian Genocide
Male murder victims
Murder in Portugal
People murdered in Portugal
Portugal–Turkey relations
Terrorist attacks attributed to Armenian militant groups
Turkish people murdered abroad

tr:1982 Lizbon saldırısı